in Izu, Shizuoka is a Japanese photographer.

As a student Furuya studied architecture and then spent two years at Tokyo College of Photography. In 1973 he left his studies and his native Japan and traveled, ending up, according to Arthur Ollman in his book, The Model Wife, "a man in exile. He wears alienation like an obligation."  In Austria where he lived since 1982 he met and married Christine Gössler. From 1984 to 1987 he lived in East Berlin and worked as translator. Christine was to become the primary subject of his photography until her suicide in 1985. His last pictures of her are of her shoes, neatly placed by the window she had just jumped out of, and her body, shot from the same window, on the ground, nine stories below. Today, Furuya lives in Graz.

External links
Works and biography

References

Japanese photographers
1950 births
Living people
Place of birth missing (living people)